UFC 7: The Brawl in Buffalo was a mixed martial arts event held by the Ultimate Fighting Championship on September 8, 1995, at the Memorial Auditorium in Buffalo, New York.  The event was seen live on pay per view in the United States, and later released on home video.

History

UFC 7 featured an eight-man tournament, a UFC Superfight Championship match between reigning UFC champion Ken Shamrock and UFC 6 tournament winner Oleg Taktarov, and three alternate fights, which were not shown on the live pay-per-view broadcast. The tournament had no weight classes, or weight limits. Each match had no rounds, but a 20-minute time limit was imposed for the quarterfinal and semi-final round matches in the tournament. The finals of the tournament and the Superfight had a 30-minute time limit and, if necessary, a five-minute overtime.

Consistent with early UFC events, the time limit was not followed as the Superfight only featured a three-minute overtime, perhaps due to pay-per-view time constraints. Regardless of this, the show ran over its three-hour pay-per-view slot, cutting off some viewers from seeing the final match. The referee for the main card was 'Big' John McCarthy. Michael Buffer served as the guest ring announcer for the night. Taimak officiated the preliminary bouts on the card.

Michael Buffer mistakenly announced that Buffalo Memorial Auditorium was the home of the Buffalo Bills.  In fact, it was the home of the Buffalo Sabres.

Marco Ruas won the tournament by defeating Paul Varelans.

This was the first UFC event to be held in the state of New York. After the event, mixed martial arts were illegal in New York, which prohibited UFC or any other promotion from holding any further MMA events in the state; it would take two decades, and significant lobbying, to pass legislation allowing the sport. UFC would not hold another event in the state until UFC 205 in New York City 21 years later; the promotion later returned to Buffalo with UFC 210 in April 2017.

Results

UFC 7 bracket

See also 
 Ultimate Fighting Championship
 List of UFC champions
 List of UFC events
 1995 in UFC
 Mixed martial arts in New York

External links
UFC 7 results at Sherdog.com
Official UFC website

References

Ultimate Fighting Championship events
1995 in mixed martial arts
Mixed martial arts in New York (state)
Sports competitions in Buffalo, New York
1995 in sports in New York (state)
Sports competitions in New York (state)